Larra may refer to:

 Larra (wasp), a genus of parasitoid wasps
 Larra, Haute-Garonne, a commune in France
 Mariano José de Larra (1809 – 1837), Spanish romantic writer and journalist
 Gaizka Larrazabal (born 1997), Spanish footballer